Fleuriot is a surname. Notable people with the surname include:

Jean-Baptiste Fleuriot-Lescot (1761–1794), Belgian architect, sculptor, and a revolutionary
Léon Fleuriot (1923–1987), French linguist and Celtic scholar
Madelina Fleuriot (born 2003), Haitian footballer
Paul Antoine Fleuriot de Langle (1744–1787), French vicomte, académicien de marine, naval commander and explorer
Zénaïde Fleuriot (1829–1890), French novelist